Jeffrey Maurice Sterling, Baron Sterling of Plaistow,  (born 27 December 1934 in Stepney, London) is a British businessman and Conservative peer.   The Plaistow referred to is Plaistow, West Sussex, reflected in the land holdings in the county.

Career

Sterling founded Motability, a charity which, amongst other initiatives, oversees the Motability Scheme in providing cars for people with disabilities, in 1977 and today is currently Life President of the organisation.  He was executive chairman of the shipping line P&O from 1983 to 2005, having joined the board as a non-executive director on 6 February 1980, and is now Life President of P&O Cruises.  In 2002 he served as chairman of the Golden Jubilee Weekend Trust, in commemoration of The Queen's reign of 50 years as sovereign.

In March 2007 Sterling announced that he would be buying the Swan Hellenic brand from Carnival Corporation & plc.  In April 2007 he brokered a deal with Roger Allard's All Leisure Holidays, operator of cruise company Voyages of Discovery, to purchase the brand Swan Hellenic. Together they acquired cruise ship Explorer 2, to be renamed Minerva 1. Swan Hellenic began its new summer season in March 2008 with Lord Sterling remaining as chairman.

In October 2010 Sterling hit the headlines by suggesting cruise passengers using his company, Swan Hellenic, at Portsmouth should not mix with "ordinary" ferry passengers who were mostly "semi-lager-louts" or "lorry drivers smelling of BO". He later tried to backtrack on this statement, saying he meant 'backpackers' or 'people rushing around'.

He led the initiative to build the Queen's Row Barge Gloriana in 2012.

House of Lords
As part of Margaret Thatcher's resignation honours, he was created a life peer as Baron Sterling of Plaistow, of Pall Mall in the City of Westminster on 17 January 1991. He sits in the House of Lords as a Conservative Party peer. He was a member of the Joint Committee on the National Security Strategy from February 2010 to May 2010, and from December 2010 to May 2014.

Honours
He was appointed a Commander of the Order of the British Empire (CBE) in the 1977 Birthday Honours and was knighted in the 1985 New Year Honours for public services and services to industry, having the honour conferred by The Queen on 12 February. He was appointed Knight Grand Cross of the Royal Victorian Order (GCVO) in August 2002 in a supplement to that year's Birthday Honours list in recognition of his services in connection with the Queen's Golden Jubilee. Baron Sterling has a coat of arms with the Latin motto "Usque Per Ignem" (Trans: All the way through fire).

Sterling has also received numerous foreign honours, including: Grand Officer in the Order of May (Argentina) in 2002; Officer's Cross in the Order of Merit (Germany) in 2004; and Officier in the Légion d'Honneur (France) in 2005.

He held an honorary commission in the Royal Naval Reserve of rear admiral and was appointed honorary vice admiral in the RNR on 2 April 2015.  He is associated with HMS President.

References

Sterling of Plaistow
Life peers created by Elizabeth II
People educated at Reigate Grammar School
Knights Grand Cross of the Royal Victorian Order
Commanders of the Order of the British Empire
Knights Bachelor
Living people
1934 births
People from Chichester District
Royal Naval Reserve personnel